Albert "Al" Rossi (born June 20, 1931) is an American rower who competed in the 1952 Summer Olympics. He was born in Bessemer, Michigan. In 1952 he was the coxswain of the American boat which won the bronze medal in the coxed fours event.

References

External links
 

1931 births
Living people
People from Bessemer, Michigan
American male rowers
Coxswains (rowing)
Rowers at the 1952 Summer Olympics
Olympic bronze medalists for the United States in rowing
Sportspeople from Michigan
Medalists at the 1952 Summer Olympics